Lenin of the Rovers was a BBC Radio 4 comedy series from 1988 written by Marcus Berkmann, produced by Harry Thompson and starring comedian Alexei Sayle as Ricky Lenin, Russian captain of Felchester Rovers - Britain's only communist football team.  Other regular players in the team were Stevie Stalin (played by Andrew McClean) and Terry Trotsky (played by Keith Allen in series 1 and by Phil Cornwell in series 2).  The team was managed by Ray Royce and Colonel Brace-Cartwright (played by veteran actor Ballard Berkeley for Series 1 episodes 1 and 2. Berkeley died during recordings for the series and the part was then played by Donald Hewlett thereafter) who were frequently interviewed by Frank Lee Brian (played by real-life football commentator Kenneth Wolstenholme). John Sessions and Jim Broadbent made character appearances in Series 2.  The title is a parody of the long-running football-themed comic strip, Roy of the Rovers.

Although a knowledge of football was useful for the appreciation of the series, it was not essential. The show parodied many aspects of British football culture in the late 1980s, such as the increasing commercialisation in the game, intrusive and rarely accurate media and fan violence. The script also made frequent use of Ricky Lenin's attempts to fit in with what he saw as a 'western lifestyle', in a similar way to some of Sayle's appearances as the Balowski Family in The Young Ones.  Situations included the trouble caused by the ghost-writing of Ricky's column in The Daily Tits (parodying The Sun) (with guest appearance by Jacqueline Ashman as Curvy Corinne) - a complicated political treatise arguing in favour of collectivism in Lenin's original text is transformed by the newspaper's ghost writer to "I hate all paddies, but I wouldn't mind giving that Gloria Hunniford one" in the paper; the north–south economic divide in England ("In Crunchthorpe there's a hundred and three per cent unemployment.  The Government uses the place to dump nuclear waste...they pile it up in the town centre, outside Freeman Hardy and Willis") and films The Titfield Thunderbolt and Apocalypse Now.

The script regularly took great delight in the unsophisticated nature of British football, with its traditional emphasis on strength over skill:

Northern pundit: "The average Crunchsider knows his football like the back of his hand and what he really likes to see is really elegant, skilful one-touch players...out in the middle of the park, screaming in agony, clutching their gonads."

Commentator:  "So Crunchthorpe don't really go in for one-touch play, then?"

Northern pundit: "Oh, aye, they do.  Provided the one touch is delivered just below the kneecaps like a steam hammer hitting an avocado..."

A running gag in the show was various characters (particularly Sayle) speaking lines from well known pop songs as dialogue. The fictional town of Felchester was a joke: a reference to felching, conflating that term with Melchester, the fictional home of Roy of the Rovers. In one episode, "The Fifth Man", the Cambridge Five spy scandal is mocked when Felchester plays Cambridge in the FA Cup and wins as a result of Cambridge players, including a mysterious fifth man, scoring own goals against their own team.

Lenin of the Rovers ran for two series, each comprising four shows. The final two episodes of series 2 were postponed due to the Hillsborough disaster, and were eventually aired sixteen years later in 2005.

Episodes

Series 1)

Series 2

Episodes 3 and 4 of series 2 were cancelled from their original scheduled broadcast dates of 15 April and 22 April 1989 respectively due to the Hillsborough disaster, and were not broadcast until the series was repeated on BBC 7 in April 2005. However, the whole of series 2 was released by the BBC as a double-cassette set in 1992.

External links
epguides.com Lenin of the Rovers on epguides.com
BBC Lenin of the Rovers on bbc.co.uk
radiolistings.co.uk Lenin of the Rovers on radiolistings.co.uk

BBC Radio 4 programmes
BBC Radio comedy programmes
1988 radio programme debuts
1989 disestablishments
Fictional association football clubs